Tillandsia pachyaxon is a species of flowering plant in the family Bromeliaceae. It is endemic to Ecuador.  Its natural habitat is subtropical or tropical moist montane forests. It is threatened by habitat loss.

References

Flora of Ecuador
pachyaxon
Endangered plants
Taxonomy articles created by Polbot